Office of the Auditor General may refer to:
Office of the Auditor General (Burma)
Office of the Auditor General of Colombia
Office of the Auditor-General (Kenya)
Office of the Auditor General (Nepal)
Office of the Auditor General (New Zealand)
Office of the Auditor General of Norway
Office of the Auditor General Manitoba
Office of the Auditor General (Roman Curia), an administrative institution of the Holy See